The Clifford Day Mallory Cup, or Mallory Cup for short, is the competition for the United States Adult Sailing Championship.

In a sport with hundreds of different classes of boats and a national champion for each, the point of the Mallory Cup is to determine an overall champion for the sport of sailing in the United States. Run by US Sailing (as opposed to any given class), eliminations are held throughout the country, and the finals are raced in a different type of boat each year to eliminate any advantage a sailor from any particular class might otherwise have. Competitors sail boats that are provided by the host club, and teams are required to race each boat at the event once so that nobody will have an advantage in terms of equipment.

As with national championships in other sports, the top three finishers receive gold, silver, and bronze medals. The winner holds the Clifford Day Mallory Cup until the following year's champion is crowned. A piece of history itself, the Mallory Cup was originally given by the Sultan of the Ottoman Empire to the family of Lord Nelson in appreciation of his command over the English fleet that defeated Napoleon in the Battle of the Nile.

History 
1952 YRA of Long Island Sound – Cornelius Shields, Cornelius Shields, Jr., William Leboutillier
1953 Gulf YA – Eugene H. Walet, III, John Ryan, Ralph Christman, Eugene H. Walet, II
1954 Gulf YA – Eugene H. Walet, III, Allen McClure, Jr., Gilbert Friedreichs, Jr.
1955 Pacific International YA – William Buchan, Jr., William Buchan, Sr., Ron McFarlane
1956 YRU of Massachusetts Bay – Fred E. Hood, Bradley P. Noyes, Charles Pingree
1957 YRU of Massachusetts Bay – George D. O'Day, David J. Smith, Charles A. Forsberg
1958 Texas YA – Robert Mosbacher, George C. Francisco, III, C.B. Masterson
1959 Inland Lake YA – Harry C. Melges, Jr., John B. Shethar, Jr., Edward Smith
1960 Inland Lake YA – Harry C. Melges, Jr., Gloria Melges, John B. Shethar, Jr., Edward Smith
1961 Inland Lake YA – Harry C. Melges, Jr., Dr. A. R. Wenzel, John B. Shethar, Jr.
1962 Inland Lake YA – James S. Payton, Peter Barrett, Chuck Miller
1963 YRA of San Francisco Bay – Jim DeWitt, Jocelyn Nash, Jacob VanHeeckeren
1964 Gulf YA – G. Shelby Freidrichs, Jr., Tommy Dreyfuss, Ray Troendle, Sr.
1965 YRA of Long Island Sound – Cornelius Shields, Jr., Dr. George Brazil, Jr., Craig Walters
1966 YRA of Long Island Sound – William S. Cox, Thomas Hume, Robert Barton
1967 Barnegat Bay YRA – Clifford W. Campbell, Howard Wright, Ann Campbell
1968 Southern Massachusetts YRA – James A. Hunt, Bourne Knowles, Joshua Hunt
1969 YRA of Long Island Sound – Graham M. Hall, John Luard, Jack G. McAllister
1970 Florida SA – Dr. John W. Jennings, James L. Pardee, Barbara Pardee
1971 Texas YA – John Kolius, Bill Hunt, Scott Self
1972 Florida SA – Edwin H. Sherman, Jr., Harvey A. Ford, Hubert Rutland, III
1973 Florida SA – Dr. John W. Jennings, James L. Pardee, Barbara Pardee
1974 YRA of San Francisco Bay – Vann Wilson, Nate Russel, Frank Thompson
1975 YRA of Long Island Sound – Christopher W. Pollak, Lisa Hamm, William Ehrhorn
1976 Southern California YA – David Crockett, Sid Exley, Kurt Nicolai
1977 Texas YA – Marvin Bleckman, Curt Oetking, Tommy Simms
1978 Texas YA – Glenn Darden, Kelly Gough, Jay Raymond
1979 Texas YA – Glenn Darden, Kelly Gough, Scott Young
1980 Southern California YA – David Ullman, Bill Herrschaft, Paul Murphy
1981 Texas YA – Mark Foster, Chuck Wilk, Scott Young
1982 Southern California YA – Mark Golison, Bruce Golison, Jay Golison
1983 YRA of Long Island Sound – Peter Coleman, Paul Coleman, Barry Purcell
1984 Gulf YA – Marc Eagan, Corky Hadden, Beau Le Blanc
1985 Texas YA – Scott Young, Jody Smith, Doug Kern
1986 Pacific International YA – Jack Christiansen, Charlie McKee, Cheryl Lanzinger
1987 Texas YA – Scott Young, Mike Haggerty, Doug Kern, John Moran
1988 Gulf YA – Dennis Stieffel, Bubby Eagan, Peter Merrifield
1989 Texas YA – Paul Foerster, Mark Rylander, John Bartlett
1990 YRU of Southern California – Scott Deardorff, Matt Wilson, Kirk Arndt
1991 Lake Hopatcong YC – Alex Smigelski, Brent Barbehenn, Lloyd Kitchin
1992 San Francisco YC – Jeff Madrigali, Gary Grande, Jeff Wayne
1993 Eastern YC – John Slattery, Brad White, Bob Slattery
1994 New Orleans YC –Benz Faget, Tom Baker, David Bolyard
1995 Niantic Bay YC, CT – Bill Healy, Tim Healy, Adam Walsh
1996 Royal Victorian YC – Michael Turner, Jeff Eckard, Olaf Thyvold
1997 Royal Victorian YC – Michael Turner, Olaf Thyvold, Brian Lister
1998 Seattle, WA – Dalton Bergan, Kevin Guitron, Mike Visser
1999 Gulf YA – Benz Faget, Michael Mark, David Zahn, David Bolyard
2000 Gulfport YC – Robert Schmidt, David Bolyard, Hew Hamilton
2001 Not Sailed – [Patriots Cup: Brock Schmidt, David Bolyard, Tom Baker]
2002 Boston YC – Charles Quigley, David Bryan, Leo Fallon, Bill Hooper
2003 Bay Waveland YC – Zak Fanberg, Eugene Shmitt & Kippy Chamberlain
2004 Bay Waveland YC – Zak Fanberg, Dave Blouin, Kippy Chamberlain
2005 Bay Waveland YC – Zak Fanberg, Sara Fanberg, Marcus Eagan
2006 Austin YC – Scott Young, John Morran, Douglas Kern
2007 San Diego, YC – Brian Camet, Alex Camet, Daniel Camet
2008 Austin YC- Scott Young, John Morran, Doug Kern, Mike Haggerty
2009 Bay Waveland YC Andrew Eagan, Marcus Eagan, Katherine Santa Cruz
2010 Vineyard Haven Yacht Club Paul Wilson, John Plominski, William Stevens
2011 Babylon Yacht Club David M. Hyer, David A. Hyer, Gregory Schneller
2012 Not Sailed
2013 Ventura Yacht Club: David Klatt, Lane Desborough, Garrett Baum, David Paudler
2014 Southern Yacht Club:Benz Faget, Randall Richmond, Thomas Sweeney
2015 Manhattan Yacht Club: Eric Leitner, Doug Witter, Adam Sandberg, Tom Sinatra, Michael Ambrose
2016 St. Francis Yacht Club (Northern California YRA): Russ Silvestri, John Collins, Mario Yovkov, Maggie Bacon
2017 Sail Maine (Northeast Sailing Association): Carter White, Michael McAllister, Henry Cole, Fiona Gordon
2018 Inland Lake Yachting Association: Michael Hanson, Tim Siemers, Mark Swift
2019 Chesapeake Bay Yacht Racing Association: John Loe, Jake Doyle, Jamie Gilman, Robbie Deane
2020 Not Sailed
2021 Gulf Yacht Association: Max Albert, Andrew Brennan, Matthew Dupuy, Eddie Adams

References

External links 
Official website

United States Sailing Championships